Asclepias angustifolia, commonly called the Arizona milkweed , is an endemic species of milkweed native only to Arizona.

Description
The stems arise from a single crown, and can be many.

Ecology 
Found at higher elevations (around ), it is known only from Pima, Santa Cruz, and Cochise counties in Arizona, United States. Native substrate mostly consists of dry rocky soils. Habit includes riparian woodlands, floodplain meadows, cienega edges, canyons, and arroyo bottoms. It is considered rare in Arizona, and restricted to the borderlands. This species is a known host plant to the Monarch Butterfly.  Because it serves as a nesting ground for the Monarch's larvae, it is a vital component in preventing the extinction of these butterflies.   It has been observed to be pollinated by small species of Carpenter Bees (Ceratina sp.).

Cultivation 
The Arizona milkweed is commercially available by both seed and propagated plants. Seed readily germinates, and mature flowering plants can be grown in as little as three months. Plants can be successfully grown in containers as small as a quart. This species is tolerant of excess watering and lack of watering, in which substrate has not been seen to be an important factor in growth. Substrates utilized have been both organic-rich and replacement to sandy loam profiles.

Pollination 

Asclepias angustifolia pollination is performed mechanically by insects.

References 

angustifolia
Flora of Arizona